This is the order of battle for the First Battle of Târgu Frumos (early April 1944), a World War II Soviet offensive against Axis powers in Târgu Frumos, Romania.

Soviet
2nd Tank Army, Lieutenant-General Semen Bogdanov
27th Army, Lieutenant-General Sergei Trofimenko 
35th Guards Rifle Corps, Lieutenant-General Sergey Goryachev
3rd Guards Airborne Division
93rd Guards Rifle Division
202nd Rifle Division
206th Rifle Division
40th Army, Lieutenant-General Filipp Zhmachenko
51st Rifle Corps, Major-General P.P. Avdeenko
42nd Guards Rifle Division

Axis

German
8th Army, General der Infanterie Otto Wöhler
Grossdeutschland Panzer Grenadier Division, General der Panzertruppe Hasso von Manteuffel
Panzer Regiment
Panzer Grenadier Regiment
Panzer Fusilier Regiment

Romanian
4th Army, Lieutenant-General Ioan Mihail Racoviță
1st Army Corps
6th Infantry Division
4th Army Corps
1st Guards Division
7th Infantry Division

References

Targu Frumos
World War II orders of battle